A list of films produced in Egypt in 1977. For an A-Z list of films currently on Wikipedia, see :Category:Egyptian films.

External links
 Egyptian films of 1977 at the Internet Movie Database
 Egyptian films of 1977 elCinema.com

Lists of Egyptian films by year
1977 in Egypt
Lists of 1977 films by country or language